

Events 
 January–December 
 February 21 – The Prussian Confederation is formed.
 April 9 – Christopher of Bavaria is elected King of Denmark.
 April – Murad II lays siege to Belgrade. The city is heavily damaged, but the defenders' use of artillery prevents the Turks from capturing the city.
 September 13 – Breton knight Gilles de Rais is taken into custody, upon an accusation of murdering children brought against him by the Bishop of Nantes.
 September – The term of Regent of Sweden Karl Knutsson Bonde ends, as newly elected king of Denmark Christopher of Bavaria is also elected king of Sweden.
 October 22 – Gilles de Rais confesses, and is sentenced to death.

 Date unknown 
 Itzcóatl, Aztec ruler of Tenochtitlan, dies and is succeeded by Moctezuma I (Moctezuma Ilhuicamina).
 Lorenzo Valla's De falso credita et ementita Constantini Donatione declamatio demonstrates that the Donation of Constantine is a forgery.
 Eton College is founded by Henry VI of England.
 Sir Richard Molyneux is appointed constable of Liverpool Castle, in England.
 The Ming Dynasty government of China begins a decade-long series of issuing harsh edicts towards those who illegally mine silver, the latter known as 'miner bandits', a trend begun in 1438. The government wants to cap the amount of silver circulating into the market, as more grain taxes are converted into silver taxes. The government establishes community night watches known as 'watches and tithings', who ensure that illegal mining activities are brought to a halt. However, these are desperate measures, as illegal silver mining continues to thrive as a dangerous but lucrative venture.
 Uwaifiokun, Oba of Benin, is killed by his brother, the Prince Ogun, who succeeds him as Ewuare I.
 Zhu Quan writes the Cha Pu ("Tea manual") in China.

Births 
 January 22 – Ivan III of Russia (d. 1505)
 February 13 – Hartmann Schedel, German physician (d. 1514)
 date unknown – Clara Tott, German court singer (d. 1520)

Deaths 

 March 9 – Frances of Rome, Italian Benedictine nun and saint (b. 1384)
 March 20 – Sigismund Kęstutaitis, Grand Duke of Lithuania (b. 1365)
 April 2 – Giovanni Vitelleschi, Italian Roman Catholic bishop and soldier
 April 6 – Henry Wardlaw, Scottish church leader
 September 20 – Frederick I, Elector of Brandenburg (b. 1371)
 September 30 – Reginald Grey, 3rd Baron Grey de Ruthyn, English soldier and politician
 October 12 – Ginevra d'Este (b. 1419)
 October 26 – Gilles de Rais, French soldier (b. 1404)
 November 13 – Joan Beaufort, Countess of Westmoreland
 date unknown –
 Itzcóatl, Aztec Tlatoani (ruler) of Tenochtitlan
 Uwaifiokun, Oba of Benin

References